The Saca is a left tributary of the river Solca in Romania. It flows into the Solca in Arbore.

References

Rivers of Romania
Rivers of Suceava County